Asante-Akim Central is one of the constituencies represented in the Parliament of Ghana. It elects one Member of Parliament (MP) by the first past the post system of election. Asante-Akim Central is located in the Asante Akim North district of the Ashanti Region of Ghana. The member of parliament for the constituency is Kwame Anyimadu-Antwi.

Boundaries 
The seat is located within the Asante Akim Central Municipal Assembly of the Ashanti Region of Ghana. Asante Akim Central District is one of the districts in Ashanti Region, Ghana. It was formerly known the Asante Akim North Municipal District until July 2012, when part of the district was split out to become a new Asante Akim North District; thus the remaining being renamed as Asante Akim Central Municipal District. The municipality is located in the eastern part of Ashanti Region and has Konongo as its capital town.

Members of Parliament

Elections

See also 

 List of Ghana Parliament constituencies

External links 

 PROLIFERATION OF NEW DISTRICTS AND CONSTITUENCIES IN GHANA
 https://www.ghanabusinessnews.com/2012/06/15/electoral-commission-to-create-new-constituencies/
 The Electoral Commission of Ghana And the Administration of the 2012 Elections
 Asante Akim Central Municipal Assembly MEDIUM TERM DEVELOPMENT PLAN 2014-2017.pdf
 The Re-demarcation and Reapportionmentof Parliamentary Constituencies in Ghana

References 

Parliamentary constituencies in the Ashanti Region